The Lockheed XB-30 (company model L-249) was the design submitted by Lockheed after the request by the United States Army Air Forces for a very heavy bomber, the same request that led to the Boeing B-29 Superfortress, the Douglas XB-31 and Consolidated B-32 Dominator.

Design and development
Around 1938, General Henry H. "Hap" Arnold, the head of the United States Army Air Corps, was growing alarmed at the possibility of war in Europe and in the Pacific. Hoping to be prepared for the long-term requirements of the Air Corps, Arnold created a special committee chaired by Brigadier General Walter G. Kilner; one of its members was Charles Lindbergh. After a tour of Luftwaffe bases, Lindbergh became convinced that Nazi Germany was far ahead of other European nations.

In a 1939 report, the committee made a number of recommendations, including development of new long-range heavy bombers. When war broke out in Europe, Arnold requested design studies from several companies on a Very Long-Range bomber capable of traveling . Approval was granted on 2 December 1939.

Based on the design of the Lockheed L-049 (subsequently adopted by the United States Army Air Forces as the C-69), the L-249 never progressed past the design stage, mainly because Boeing had a huge head start with its Boeing B-29 Superfortress, using the same Wright R-3350 Duplex-Cyclone radials as the XB-30 was intended to use. Only a scale model was built. Retaining the wings and tail surfaces of the Model 49, the Model 249-58-01 was to have had a new fuselage with up to six gun turrets (one in the nose, two above and two below the fuselage, and one in the tail) housing ten .50-caliber guns—twinned up in each turret for the nose, dorsal, and ventral emplacements; and one 20-mm cannon for the tail defensive position. Ventral bomb bays were to accommodate eight  bombs.

Specifications (as proposed)

See also

References
Notes

Bibliography

 Stringfellow, Curtis K., and Peter M. Bowers. Lockheed Constellation. St. Paul, Minnesota: Motorbooks, 1992.

External links
 USAF Museum — XB-30 Factsheet

B-030
Four-engined tractor aircraft
Low-wing aircraft
Cancelled military aircraft projects of the United States
XB-30
Four-engined piston aircraft
Triple-tail aircraft